Walter Dudley Reed (June 1, 1924 – July 28, 2022) was a major general in the United States Air Force. He was the United States Air Force Judge Advocate General from 1977 to 1980.  He held law degrees from the Drake University Law School as well as McGill University, and also attended The Hague Academy of International Law in the Netherlands. Reed died on July 28, 2022, at the age of 98.

References

1924 births
2022 deaths
American expatriates in the Netherlands
Drake University Law School alumni
McGill University alumni
Military personnel from Iowa
People from Dallas County, Iowa
The Hague Academy of International Law people
United States Air Force generals